Dharmajan Bolgatty (born 1976) is an Indian actor, producer, comedian, politician and entrepreneur, who works in Malayalam films, television, and stage shows. He began his career as a comedian appearing in sketch comedies on stage, later forayed into such comedic television shows and into films in 2010s. Dharmajan entered active politics in 2021, ahead of the assembly elections in Kerala. He is a member of Indian National Congress and was the United Democratic Front candidate in Balusseri constituency.

Career
He appeared in several TV shows and received his breakthrough through the success of the TV comedy show Bluff Master on Asianet Plus, hosted along with his friend Ramesh Pisharody. Later they became a popular comedy duo. Both of them together have wrote script for the comedy show Cinemala. The duo is also known for the Malayalam TV show Badai Bungalow. He started his Malayalam cinema career with the film Paappi Appacha (2010). He played the role of Dileep's driver sidekick. He is mainly seen in comedy roles.

After his full length role in Paappi Appacha, his roles in Kattappanayile Rithwik Roshan, Aadu and Aadu 2 established him as a comedy actor in the Malayalam film industry. He is also announced to become a playback singer. He is also a businessman and has established fish stores himself. He is also a film producer and produced a film named Nithyaharitha Nayakan in 2018.

Politics
Dharmajan is a member of Indian National Congress. He was active in student politics and was a member of Kerala Students Union, the student wing of Congress. He ended his active presence in politics when he became busy in the field of art. He entered active politics again in 2021, ahead of the assembly elections in Kerala. In the 2021 assembly election, he represented the United Democratic Front in Balusseri constituency. He failed to the LDF candidate, Sachin Dev for 20000 plus votes.

Personal life

He was born to Kumaran and Madhavi in a Pulaya family at Mulavukad, one of the islands that forms part of the city of Kochi, Kerala. He completed his primary education at Mulavukad High School and later joined St. Albert's College. He is married to Anuja and has two daughters, Veda and Vyga.

Filmography

Films

Television

Awards and nominations 
 Nominations
Nomination, Asianet Film Awards for Best Supporting Actor (Kattappanayile Rithwik Roshan) 
Nomination, 6th South Indian International Movie Awards for Best Comedian Malayalam (Kattappanayile Rithwik Roshan) 
Nomination, 8th South Indian International Movie Awards for Best Comedian Malayalam (Kuttanadan Marpappa)
Nomination, 2nd IIFA Ultsalvam for performance in a comic role Malayalam (Kattappanayile Rithwik Roshan) 
Nomination, 2nd IIFA Ultsalvam for performance in a comic role Malayalam (Kattappanayile Rithwik Roshan)
Nomination, 10th South Indian International Movie Awards for Best Comedian Malayalam (Dhamaka)

Won
Won, Flowers Gulf Film Awards - Best comedy actor (Kattappanayile Rithwik Roshan)
Won, Vanitha Film Awards 2017 for Best Comedian (Kattappanayile Rithwik Roshan)
Won, Versatile Performer (TV) - Asianet Comedy Awards (Badai Bungalow)
Won, Asianet Film Awards 2018 - Best comedian (Various films)
Won, 3rd Anand TV film awards - Best Comedian (various films)

References

External links
 

Living people
Male actors from Kochi
Male actors in Malayalam cinema
Indian male film actors
21st-century Indian male actors
Indian male television actors
Male actors in Malayalam television
Indian politicians
1976 births